Elections to the Stirling District Council took place in May 1988, alongside elections to the councils of Scotland's various other districts. The number of seats and the total vote share won by each party is listed below.

References

Stirling Council elections
1988 Scottish local elections